Robert Philip Orlando (born January 11, 1958), also known as Bobby Orlando or just Bobby O, is an American record producer, indie record label owner, songwriter, and musician. He is regarded as an innovator in the hi-NRG genre for developing his signature sound; utilizing a "powerful beat" and "new wave-style" vocals with the help of a "heavy [synthesizer] bass," synthesizers, piano, guitars, cowbells.

Early life 
The son of a suburban New York schoolteacher, Orlando declined a classical music scholarship to pursue his then current musical interest, glam rock. In the late 1970s, his professional interests turned to disco and shortly thereafter, he established his own record label, "O" Records.

Music career
Bobby Orlando has been active as prolific music producer, songwriter, musician, and record label impresario. During the 1980s he produced, composed and performed on hundreds of music productions that he released under various record labels, including "O" Records, Bobcat Records, Memo Records, Telefon Records, MenoVision Records, Beach Records, Plastic Records, Eurobeat Records, Obscure Records, Beat Box Records, Riovista Records, Intelligent Records, Basic Records, Knowledge Records and others. In the late 1980s, at the peak of his success, he stopped being active as a producer.

Orlando is credited as one of the founding fathers of hi-NRG dance music. His productions are easily identifiable by their dense synthesizers, rolling bass lines, and resounding percussion.  He has played multiple instruments on his tracks including electronic keyboards, guitars, bass, synthesizers, drums, piano, assorted percussion, trumpet and saxophone. The ringing cowbell percussion lines and robotic sequencers heard in "She Has a Way", "The Best Part of Breakin' Up" and "Native Love (Step by Step)" have been described as defining his trademark sound.

As a solo artist, Bobby O scored hits with tracks "She Has a Way", "How to Pick Up Girls", "Suspicious Minds", and "I'm So Hot for You". He created his project concept the Flirts, to further front his performances as an artist, musician and songwriter. With an ever revolving roster of female session singers and models, Orlando churned out the hits "Passion", "Danger", and "Helpless".  His association with underground film star Divine resulted in classic club anthems "Native Love (Step by Step)" (featuring Orlando's voice in the chorus), "Love Reaction", and "Shoot Your Shot". Orlando also produced The Fast, later to be known as Man 2 Man.

When Neil Tennant, then an assistant editor at Smash Hits, and later a member of Pet Shop Boys, was sent to interview the Police in 1983 in New York, he sought out Orlando. Both Tennant and fellow Pet Shop Boy Chris Lowe admired Orlando's sound and productions – "Passion" by the Flirts, being a particular favorite. Orlando decided to produce a Pet Shop Boys album and released their earliest 12-inches including the original 1984 version of "West End Girls" and "One More Chance". Orlando and the Pet Shop Boys recorded twelve tracks together, including the original "It's a Sin", "Opportunities (Let's Make Lots of Money)", and "I Get Excited".

Orlando wrote and produced music in multiple genres in mostly self-created groups and aliases, often just consisting of Orlando himself. He sang lead vocals in many of his groups including One, Two, Three ("Another Knife in My Back", "Runaway"), The Now ("Can You Fix Me Up With Her"), The Bigalows, Hippies with Haircuts, Kinski Music, Barbie & the Kens ("Just a Gigolo"), and Waterfront Home ("Play That Jukebox"). His productions were released under the names: The Flirts, Ian Darby, The Beat Box Boys, Spooge Boy, Something/Anything, New Breed, Jonny Bankcheck, Hotline, Waterfront Home, Banana Republic, Oh Romeo, Teenrock, The New York Models, Hippies With Haircuts, Girly, Barbie & the Kens, Wow, 1 plus 1, The He Man Band, The Boyd Brothers, Nancy Dean, Ian Darby with Ya Ya, Cha Cha featuring Don Diego, Yukihoro Takanawa, This is House, Joy Toy, Dressed To Kill, Band Of South, Dynasty featuring Dexter D, The Now, "One, Two, Three", Darlene Down, The Fem-Spies, Gangsters of House, Girls Have Fun, Zwei Maenner, Gomez Presley, and others. 

Other aliases of Bobby Orlando include John "Gumball" Gonzales, C. Shore, Cha Cha Garcia, Klaus Vogel, Mein, B. Banora, Yuki, and Gato Perro. Bobby Orlando also produced recording artists Franki Avalon, Claudja Barry, Lyn Todd, Tod Foster, Tony Caso, Leah, and Nadia Cassini. In 1996, Orlando founded the short-lived Eurodance label Reputation Records, involving himself in the production of much of the label's releases as well.

Orlando's songs frequently deal with philosophical themes such as "Try It (I'm in Love with a Married Man)", which was given a contemporary twist when it was re-recorded by Pet Shop Boys in 2003 (see Disco 3).  Many of Orlando's lyrics describe unrequited love, private despair, personal angst and a truth-seeking perspective.  Orlando frequently etched philosophical maxims into vinyl records featuring his songs; these adages being literally cut into the grooves near the "lead out" and "lock grooves" of the vinyl. Many of these are rare and are now collector items often selling for hundreds of dollars.

His music has appeared in numerous motion pictures, including A Nightmare on Elm Street 2: Freddy's Revenge, Wigstock: The Movie, Kiss Kiss Bang Bang, Valley Girl, Dark Mirror, Flying, High Risk, Rappin, Underground, and This Is The Night. (IMDB)

French electroclash duo Miss Kittin & the Hacker mention Orlando in their song "Walking in the Sunshine" from their 2001 release, First Album ("I love men like Bobby Orlando / The Flirts composer a long time ago / It makes me laugh a lot, you know / But I don't want to show").

Orlando has influenced various Eurodisco, tropical house, techno, Italo disco, electronic dance music ("EDM") and hi-NRG releases. He has been cited by music historians for his contribution to dance music.

Activity in the 2010s
Orlando's most recent releases as of 2016 were: 
December 2016 CD Perception of One
December 2015 CD Paragon of Energy
November 2014 CD Twilight Of The Masses
2013 CD Idols of the Mind
2012 CD Self-Evident Truth
2012 CD Primitive Primal Scream
2011 CD Social Contract Theory
2010 CD Bright Nothing World

Discography

Albums

Singles

Production discography
Bobby Orlando productions:

Oh Romeo discography 
Oh Romeo, was a concept group created by Bobby Orlando. Each release featured different session singers.
 1987
"Living Out A Fantasy"
The song "One More Shot" was also featured on the 1994 Avex Trax album Super Eurobeat Presents Hi-NRG '80s.
In 1991 the Hot Productions label released their greatest hits album, These Memories: The Best of Oh Romeo.

Notes

External links 
 Discogs Bobby Orlando Discography
 MassiveDance2010: YouTube channel with recent releases

Record producers from New York (state)
American dance musicians
American hi-NRG musicians
Musicians from New York City
Living people
1958 births
Singer-songwriters from New York (state)